Hacienda Lipangue Airport ,  is an airstrip  southwest of Lampa, a city in the Santiago Metropolitan Region of Chile.

There is mountainous terrain in all quadrants except east.

See also

Transport in Chile
List of airports in Chile

References

External links
OpenStreetMap - Hacienda Lipangue
OurAirports - Hacienda Lipangue
FallingRain - Hacienda Lipangue Airport

Airports in Santiago Metropolitan Region